Tyndrum is a small village in Scotland. Its Gaelic name translates as "the house on the ridge". It lies in Strathfillan, at the southern edge of Rannoch Moor.

Location and facilities
Tyndrum is a popular tourist village, and a noted stop on the A82 for road travellers to refresh at the Green Welly Stop or one of the several other cafés and hotels. There is a filling station. The village is on the West Highland Way, and has a campsite, hotel, bunkhouse and bed and breakfasts to accommodate walkers.

Overshadowed by Ben Lui, a Munro, Tyndrum is built over the battlefield where Clan MacDougall defeated Robert the Bruce in 1306 CE, and supposedly took from him the Brooch of Lorn.

Railways
The village is notable as a junction of transport routes. Tyndrum has a station on each branch: Upper Tyndrum on the Fort William line and Tyndrum Lower on the Oban line.

Indeed, Tyndrum is the smallest settlement in the UK with more than one railway station. This is partly a legacy of the history of the railways in the area, after two separate railways belonging to different railway companies were built through the village. However, the main reason is geography: splitting the line in Crianlarich allows the contours of the glen to be used to avoid very steep climbs heading north or west from Tyndrum. Roads mirror this division: the A82 from Glasgow to Fort William passes through Tyndrum, and the A85 to Oban splits off just north of the village.

Mines
Tyndrum is a former mining centre. The hamlet of Clifton (the row of cottages across the A82 from the Green Welly) is made up of the former mining cottages, and up the hillside beyond them the tailings of a former lead mine can be seen. Historical records indicate that the mine was exploited in several different phases between 1730 and 1928. Opencast mining was carried out from 1741 to 1745 under the orders of Sir Robert Clifton. The Scots Mining Company owned the mineral rights to the area from 1768 to 1791, introducing water-powered crushing machinery.

Work on constructing the mine began in the 1980s but low gold prices forced the closure of the mine before it became fully operational. In October 2011 it was announced that the mine would be reactivated. Following planning difficulties, which featured in the BBC Four programme Tales from the National Parks, and a fall in the price of gold, opening of the mine was again delayed. Work is continuing to update capital and operating cost estimates and include opportunities for savings. This is expected to be complete by the end of July 2015.

References

External links

 Tyndrum local community website
 Gazetteer entry for Tyndrum

Villages in Stirling (council area)
Mining communities in Scotland
Gold mines in Scotland